The Body Wishes Tour was worldwide tour held by British singer Rod Stewart to promote his album Body Wishes. The tour began on 25 May 1983 in Luxembourg and ended on 7 August 1983 in Sun City.

Tour dates

Set list

Tonight I'm Yours
Sweet Little Rock And Roller (Chuck Berry cover)
Dancin' Alone
Tonight's The Night (Gonna Be Alright)
Passion
She Won't Dance With Me/Little Queenie (Chuck Berry cover)
Sweet Surrender
I Don't Want To Talk About It
You're In My Heart (The Final Acclaim)
Baby Jane
Young Turks
What Am I Gonna Do (I'm So In Love With You)
Da Ya Think I'm Sexy?
Hot Legs
Gasoline Alley
Maggie May
You Wear It Well
I Was Only Joking
Sailing (Sutherland Brothers cover)

Personnel

Rod Stewart - the singer
Robin Le Mesurier - guitars and vocals
Jim Cregan - guitars and vocals
Jay Davis - bass and vocals
Tony Brock - drums
Kevin Savigar - keyboards
Jimmy Zavala - sax/harmonica

References 

1983 concert tours
Rod Stewart concert tours